The 1917 Penn State Nittany Lions football team represented the Pennsylvania State College in the 1917 college football season. The team was led by third-year head coach Dick Harlow, with Lawrence Whitney as an assistant coach, his final season. The Nittany Lions played their home games at New Beaver Field in State College, Pennsylvania.

Schedule

References

Penn State
Penn State Nittany Lions football seasons
Penn State Nittany Lions football